Yevgeny Yurievich Steblov (born December 8, 1945, Moscow) is a Soviet and Russian film and theater actor, honored as a People's Artist of Russia in 1993. He serves as First Deputy Chairman of the Union of Theatre Workers of the Russian Federation.

Biography 
Yevgeny Steblov was born in 1945 in Moscow. His father, Yuri Steblov (1924-2000) was a radio engineer, and his mother, Martha (born 1924), was a teacher. His uncle, Viktor Steblov, is a known Moscow bibliophile and manager of a bookstore.

Yevgeny Steblov graduated from the Boris Shchukin Theatre Institute. In his first big movie role, he played Sasha Shatalov in the film Georgiy Daneliya Walking the Streets of Moscow (1963).

Selected filmography
 1963 — Walking the Streets of Moscow as Sasha Shatalov
 1964 — Goodbye, Boys as Volodya
 1968 — A Literature Lesson as Konstantin Mikhailovich, literature teacher
 1971 — Yegor Bulychyov and Others as Tyatin
 1972 — Taming of the Fire as Innokenti Bashkirtsev
 1975 — A Slave of Love as actor Kanin
 1980 — A Few Days from the Life of I.I. Oblomov as father
 1981 — The Hound of the Baskervilles as Dr. Mortimer
 1985 — Do Not Marry, Girls as Andrey, barber
 1998 — The Barber of Siberia as Grand Duke Alexey
 2007 — Election Day as Director
 2013 — Ku! Kin-dza-dza as salesman of mirages

References

External links

 Евгений Стеблов: Звезда — это степень сияния

Russian male actors
1945 births
Living people
Soviet male actors
People's Artists of Russia
Recipients of the Order of Honour (Russia)
Academicians of the Russian Academy of Cinema Arts and Sciences "Nika"
Communist Party of the Soviet Union members